Mount Damm is a snow-covered mountain,  high, between Heidemann Glacier and Nottarp Glacier in the Queen Elizabeth Range. It was mapped by the United States Geological Survey from tellurometer surveys and from Navy air photos, 1960–62, and named by the Advisory Committee on Antarctic Names for Robert Damm, a United States Antarctic Research Program biologist at McMurdo Station, 1963–64.

References
 

Mountains of the Ross Dependency
Shackleton Coast